Tatlatunne (also, Kal-wa-natc-kuc-te-ne, Ta-a-te-ne, Ta-ah-tens, Ta-t'ea-tun, Ta-t'qla-tun, Ta-ta-ten, Ta-tla tun-ne, Tahahteens, Tahaten, and Tatqlaq-tun-tun-ne) is a former Tolowa settlement in Del Norte County, California. It lay at the present location of Crescent City.

References

Former settlements in Del Norte County, California
Former Native American populated places in California
Tolowa villages